Kairoa is a genus of flowering plants belonging to the family Monimiaceae.

Its native range is New Guinea.

Species:

Kairoa cromeana 
Kairoa endressiana 
Kairoa suberosa 
Kairoa villosa

References

Monimiaceae
Monimiaceae genera